Navrachana is an independent, co-educational, English medium school in Gujarat, India. It follows the Central Board of Secondary Education, New Delhi (CBSE) curriculum. Navrachana offers education to children from pre-primary to higher secondary.

History
Navrachana School was established in 1967. It provides education to over 2500 students, being affiliated to the CBSE. Later the school started a new branch with affiliation to Gujarat Board in 2000, which is known as 'Navrachana Vidyani Vidyalaya'.

The school is under the flagship of Suprabha Menon as the acting principal of NSS (Navrachana School Sama), and Subhalakshmi Amin as the acting Executive director of NES (Navrachana Education Society).

Facilities
Navrachana School Sama has a campus of over 60 classrooms and one of each physics, chemistry and biology labs. The school also has two music rooms, three orchestra rooms, two dance floors and three arts and craft rooms.

The school houses a creche, eight staff rooms, a health and first aid room, a counselling cell, and a dining hall of over 600 student capacity.

The school has three multipurpose play areas, two volleyball courts, two basketball courts, two tennis courts and a NCC room.

It has two libraries, a quadrangle/open air theater and two covered multipurpose activity areas.

References

External links

 Navrachana Education Society

Schools in Vadodara
Educational institutions established in 1965
Schools in Gujarat
International schools in India
Primary schools in India
1965 establishments in Gujarat